John Arthur Wynne PC (20 April 1801 – 19 June 1865) was an Irish landowner and politician.

He was the eldest surviving son of Owen Wynne (1755–1841) of Hazelwood House, Sligo, Ireland and educated at Winchester School (1816-1819) and Christ Church, Oxford (1820). He succeeded his father in 1841, inheriting the family seat of Hazelwood House, Sligo, and was appointed High Sheriff of Sligo for 1840–41.

He was elected as a Conservative Member of Parliament for Sligo in 1830 and again in 1856, resigning in 1860 by becoming Steward of the Manor of Northstead. He was made an Irish Privy Counsellor in 1852.

He died on a visit to Tuam in 1865. He had married Lady Anne Wandesford Butler, the daughter of James Butler, 1st Marquess of Ormonde. They had 2 sons (one of whom predeceased him) and 2 daughters. He was succeeded by his son Owen (1843–1910).

References

External links 
 

1801 births
1865 deaths
19th-century Irish landowners
People educated at Winchester College
Alumni of Christ Church, Oxford
Members of the Parliament of the United Kingdom for County Sligo constituencies (1801–1922)
UK MPs 1830–1831
UK MPs 1831–1832
UK MPs 1852–1857
UK MPs 1857–1859
UK MPs 1859–1865
Members of the Privy Council of Ireland
High Sheriffs of County Sligo
Under-Secretaries for Ireland